Nathaniel "Tac" Padilla was a Filipino sports shooter.

Career
He learned to use a pistol at age 9 and he was first known in the national sporting scene in 1976 when he became the junior champion of the rapid fire, center fire and standard pistol events at the Benito Juarez World Shooting Championships which was hosted in Mexico City.

He won  five gold medals, all in the rapid pistol event at the Southeast Asian Games. He won in the aforementioned event at the 1979, 1983, 1987, 1993, and 2009 editions. He did not win any gold medal in the regional tournament for 16 years until he won at the rapid fire event at the 2009 Southeast Asian Games in Laos. By 2012, Padilla has competed 17 times for the Philippines in the regional tournament. He did not participate in the 1999 and 2013 Southeast Asian Games due to the non-contest of rapid fire pistol event in those two editions.

By January 2010, he has won in nine Southeast Asian Shooting championships and achieved more than a dozen silver and bronze tournaments in other continental tournaments.

Personal life
His father was Olympic shooter Tom Ong and his siblings are Carolina, Kristine, Rose, Donald, and Jeffery. He is also the general manager of Spring Cooking Oil, his family's business.

Padilla is married to Paola Montelibano with whom he has three children. His daughter Mica is following in his footsteps, and has joined the sport.

References

Living people
Filipino male sport shooters
Shooters at the 2002 Asian Games
Shooters at the 2006 Asian Games
Shooters at the 2010 Asian Games
Southeast Asian Games gold medalists for the Philippines
Southeast Asian Games silver medalists for the Philippines
Southeast Asian Games bronze medalists for the Philippines
Southeast Asian Games medalists in shooting
Year of birth missing (living people)
Competitors at the 1979 Southeast Asian Games
Competitors at the 1983 Southeast Asian Games
Competitors at the 1987 Southeast Asian Games
Competitors at the 1993 Southeast Asian Games
Competitors at the 2005 Southeast Asian Games
Competitors at the 2009 Southeast Asian Games
Asian Games competitors for the Philippines
20th-century Filipino people
21st-century Filipino people